Pollonia or Apollonia is a seaside village in the north-eastern part of the island of Milos, Greece. It is the second harbor of Milos island after Adamantas and it has taken its name from the temple of Apollo that existed to the east of the settlement. There is a regular connection from the village to the neighboring island of Kimolos with a small boat. The main beach beach of Pollonia is sandy and popular to tourists, while there are two more beaches near the village: "Polychroni's beach" and "Piso thalassa" (translating to "Back sea").

In 1940, the village was included in the (then) community of Pera Triovasalos. According to Kallikratis plan it belongs to the community of Triovasalos of Milos municipality. It had 272 inhabitants as of the 2011 census.

References 

Villages in Greece
Populated places in Milos (regional unit)